Mayaponman is a 1997 Indian Malayalam-language film directed by Thulasidas. It had Dileep, Kalabhavan Mani and Mohini.

The film was produced by V. V. Antony, P. A. Velayudhan and P. C. Ealias under the banner of King Star Productions and was distributed by Seven Star Release. The story, script and dialogues were by J. Pallassery. The plot is loosely based on the 1987 American romantic comedy film Overboard.

Cast 
 Dileep as Prasad
 Mohini as Nandinikkutty / Indu
 Kalabhavan Mani as Freddy Lopez
 Jagathy Sreekumar as SI Benjamin C. Kuruvila
 Kuthiravattam Pappu as Motor Doctor Mathai
 Oduvil Unnikrishnan as Adv. Paulos Manavalan
 Cochin Haneefa as Pattalam Vasu
 Machan Varghese as Vasu's Assistant
 Jagannatha Varma as Priest
 Shivaji as Cheriyammavan
 Kanakalatha as Devaki Kunjamma \Younger Aunt
 Darshana
 Kumarakam Raghunath
 Kalpana as Meenakshi
 Cherthala Lalitha as Karthiyayini Kunjamma \Elder Aunt

Box office
The film was commercial success.

References

External links

Mayaponman – Malayalasangeetham.info

1990s Malayalam-language films
Films directed by Thulasidas